Daniel Cangialosi (born July 5, 1971 in Junín, Argentina) is a former Argentine footballer who played for clubs of Argentina and Chile.

Teams
  Sarmiento de Junín 1991-1994
  Vélez Sársfield 1994-1995
  Platense 1995
  Deportes Concepción 1996-1998
  Audax Italiano 1999
  Sarmiento de Junín 2000-2001

External links
 
 Profile at En una Baldosa 
 

1971 births
Living people
Argentine footballers
Argentine expatriate footballers
Club Atlético Platense footballers
Club Atlético Sarmiento footballers
Club Atlético Vélez Sarsfield footballers
Audax Italiano footballers
Deportes Concepción (Chile) footballers
Chilean Primera División players
Expatriate footballers in Chile
Association footballers not categorized by position
People from Junín, Buenos Aires
Sportspeople from Buenos Aires Province